is a Japanese term for a character development process that depicts a character with an initially harsh personality who gradually reveals a warmer, friendlier side over time.

Originally found in Japanese bishōjo games, the word is now part of the otaku moe phenomenon, reaching into other media. The term was made popular in the visual novel Kimi ga Nozomu Eien.

Terminology 
Manga author Ken Akamatsu lists tsundere as one of the special cases in his definition of moe: "The person feeling it must be stronger: the object of 'moe' is weak and dependent (like a child) on the person, or is in a situation where she cannot oppose (like a maid)... (*Tsundere only: There will be times where the stronger and weaker role is reversed)." The concept has received increasing attention in Japan, with a maid cafe named Nagomi in Akihabara started having tsundere events in 2006 and tsundere-themed products released (like Tomy Co.'s portable television set), and the concept increasingly reflected in recent anime, from an extended discussion of the meaning of the concept and its origin on the Internet in Lucky Star Lucky Channel segment classifying the characters according to tsundere-ness. Another accepted definition of tsundere is someone who has a combative attitude towards others but is also kind on the inside. They usually play out as having an attitude toward the main character, either a male or a female, and often criticizing them in one way or another, until they eventually warm up to them or fall in love with them as the series progresses, though they usually find it very hard to admit it or outright deny it in some cases.

Comiket organizer Koichi Ichikawa has described Lum from Urusei Yatsura as being both the source of moe and the first tsundere; figurine sculptor Bome has also cited Lum as an inspiration for his designs. Manga critic Jason Thompson named Madoka Ayukawa of the 1980s series Kimagure Orange Road as the root of the tsundere archetype. Other anime and manga featuring tsundere include Love Hina, Neon Genesis Evangelion, and Bakemonogatari, among many others. Some voice actors have garnered a reputation for voicing tsundere characters such as Rie Kugimiya who voices Louise in The Familiar of Zero and Nagi in Hayate the Combat Butler, and Ayana Taketatsu as Kirino Kosaka in Oreimo. In Excel Saga volume 15, author Rikdo Koshi defines tsundere as "hard on the outside, soft on the inside" and associates it with character Misaki Matsuya.

Tsundere as a concept is not strictly limited to women, and is not strictly limited to manga or anime. The character Germany from the series Hetalia: Axis Powers is portrayed as being tsundere, and is paired with a "lovable loser", Italy Veneziano. Tsundere role-play has become a common theme in maid cafés.

See also

 Ambivalence
 Glossary of anime and manga
 Hawksian woman
 Love-hate relationship
 Queen bee (sociology)
 Shrew (stock character)

Notes

References

Further reading

Anime and manga terminology
Female stock characters in anime and manga
Japanese slang